Westmoreland  was launched in Yarmouth in 1783. Between 1800 and 1804 she made two voyages as a slave ship. A French privateer captured her during her second voyage but the Royal Navy recaptured her and she completed her voyage. The registers continued to carry her for a few years but with stale data; she actually made a voyage in 1805 to Demerara. On her way a privateer captured her.

Career
Westmoreland first appeared in Lloyd's Register (LR) in 1783, sailing as a West Indiaman.

She had lost her main and mizzen masts and was bearing for Antigua. She arrived at Antigua. She arrived at Deal at end-August.

Westmoreland was registered at Whitby in 1797 with owners Robtert Gill, m.m., Henry Barrick, sen., and Jn. Watson.

In 1797, Westmoreland was on her way from Jamaica to London when she put into Hampton Roads, Virginia. By end-December she arrived back at Dover and on 2 January 1798 she arrived at Gravesend.

She was registered at Liverpool in February 1800.

Westmoreland  was re-registered at Liverpool in February 1800.

1st slave trading voyage (1800–1801): Captain Robert Catterall acquired a letter of marque on 2 April 1800. He sailed from Liverpool on 20 April. Westmoreland acquired her slaves in West Africa and arrived at Kingston on 9 January 1801 with 368. She sailed from Kingston on 4 April and arrived back at Liverpool on 4 June. She had left Liverpool with 40 crew members, had arrived at Kingston with 36, and had returned to Liverpool having suffered four crew deaths on her voyage.

2nd slave trading voyage (1803–1804): Captain Timothy Boardman acquired a letter of marque on 11 July 1823. Westmoreland left Liverpool on 9 January 1803. She acquired her slaves in Gabon. As she was sailing to the West Indies, the privateer General Ernouf captured her, but  recaptured her on 2 January 1804, or just before. Westmoreland arrived at Barbados on 5 January with 192 slaves. At some point Captain Edward Kelly replaced Boardman. Westmoreland, Kelly, master, arrived in Liverpool in early July. She had left Liverpool with 37 crew members and she suffered six crew deaths on her voyage.

Fate
Although both LR and the Register of Shipping carried Westmorelnad with data stale since 1804, it appears that Captain Baynes Reed acquired a letter of marque on 26 March 1805. He sailed for Demerara. In March or so, the French privateer Bon, of Bordeaux, captured Westmoreland. In June Lloyd's List reported that Commerce, of Liverpool, had arrived in Virginia. On her way a Spanish privateer had boarded her and transferred to her Reed and his crew.

Citations

References
  

1783 ships
Ships built in England
Age of Sail merchant ships of England
Liverpool slave ships